Mark Neville Cartwright (born 13 January 1973) is an English former footballer and manager and was technical director at Stoke City.

Playing career
Cartwright was born in Chester and played as a goalkeeper with York City, Stockport County before making his professional debut for Wrexham in 1996. He was a bit-part player at Wrexham until the 1998–99 season where he played in 43 matches and produced a fine performance in a 0–0 draw at Manchester City. However, he was overlooked in favour of Kevin Dearden and joined Brighton & Hove Albion in 2000. He played in 15 matches for the Seagulls in 2000–01 helping the side win the Third Division title. He joined Shrewsbury Town in July 2001 where he spent two seasons before retiring due to injury.

He later had a short spell as manager of Leek Town in 2006 before resigning due to work commitments. He later became goalkeeping coach at Livingston, and following this became involved with Colwyn Bay.

He played for Florida Institute of Technology Panthers in Melbourne, Florida during a period when the team recorded 56 wins, 5 losses, and 2 ties. During this time, the Panthers won three consecutive Sunshine State Conference crowns, the 1991 National Collegiate Athletic Association Division II National Championship, and had an undefeated season in 1992. He graduated with a business degree in 1992, and was inducted in the college's Hall of Fame in 2016.

Later career
He was a football agent for Beswicks Sports, his client list included Adam Yates and Liam Bridcutt. He was also involved in a number of overseas transfers from the United States to Korea.

On 10 December 2012 Cartwright was appointed technical director at Premier League club Stoke City. In July 2019 it was announced that Cartwright will leave his position at Stoke on 13 September 2019.

Career statistics
Source:

A.  The "Other" column constitutes appearances and goals in the Football League Trophy.

References

External links
 

1973 births
Living people
Sportspeople from Chester
English footballers
Association football goalkeepers
York City F.C. players
Stockport County F.C. players
Wrexham A.F.C. players
Bury F.C. players
Brighton & Hove Albion F.C. players
Shrewsbury Town F.C. players
Halifax Town A.F.C. players
English football managers
Leek Town F.C. managers
Stoke City F.C. non-playing staff
Florida Institute of Technology alumni